Group Captain Adam Nugent Wise LVO MBE BA RAF (1 August 1943 – 14 February 2008) was a pilot, Equerry to Her Majesty Queen Elizabeth II, and Private Secretary and Equerry to Prince Andrew and Prince Edward from 1983 to 1987.

Early life
Born in August 1943, he was the son of Conservative MP Roy Wise. He was educated at university  (receiving a BA), and the RAF College Cranwell from late 1964.

Royal Air Force service
Wise was a flight cadet at RAF Cranwell when he was commissioned pilot officer on 17 December 1965. He qualified as a pilot and was promoted to flying officer on 17 June 1966, and then flight lieutenant on 1 July 1968. He served with No. 21 Squadron RAF flying from RAF Khormaksar until 1968. He was awarded an MBE – Member of the Order of the British Empire in January 1977.

Wise qualified as a First Class Interpreter, and attended the Joint Service Defence College. He was promoted Squadron Leader on 1 January 1978, and posted to command the University of Wales Air Squadron until 1983, flying Scottish Aviation Bulldogs.

As a Squadron Leader, he was Equerry to The Queen 1980–1983 until 21 October 1983. Following his service, he was awarded an LVO – Royal Victorian Order in October 1983. He was then appointed Private Secretary and Equerry to Prince Andrew and Prince Edward from 21 October 1983, until 1 August 1987. On 1 July 1984 he was promoted to Wing Commander.

On 16 December 1983 he married Jill Amabel Alington, daughter of Cyril Geoffrey Marmaduke Alington of Swinhope (in West Lindsey, Lincolnshire), and Helen Amabel née Westmacott, with whom he had two children, Sophia Katherine Cassandra and Alexander Geoffrey Roy.

From 30 March 1988 he was on the staff of the RAF College, Cranwell, and on 17 November 1989 became Director of the University Air Squadrons. He was promoted to Group Captain on 1 July 1990, and was Station Commander of RAF Benson from 1992 to 1994. On 18 November 1991, he was appointed Aide-de-Camp to The Queen a role he fulfilled until 10 December 1993.

He served as a company director at 16 SUTHERLAND STREET LIMITED from 31 January 1992 to 14 February 2008.

Wise served as Military and Air Attaché at the British Embassy in Madrid, Spain, from 1993 to 1997 and retired on 1 August 1998.

Later years
Wise died on 14 February 2008 at Royal Hampshire County Hospital.

Awards
 Royal Victorian Order LVO – awarded in October 1983.
 Member of the Order of the British Empire MBE – awarded in January 1977.

References 
Notes

External links
Obituary in the Old Reptonian Newsletter

1943 births
2008 deaths
Graduates of the Royal Air Force College Cranwell
Lieutenants of the Royal Victorian Order
Members of the Order of the British Empire
Military personnel from London
Private secretaries to Prince Andrew, Duke of York
Royal Air Force officers